The Ailã River is a river of Roraima state in northern Brazil. It is located in Monte Caburaí, in the municipality of Uiramutã. Its source is the northernmost point of Brazil.

See also
List of rivers of Roraima

References

Rivers of Roraima